The Mayor of Florence is an elected politician who, along with Florence's City Council of 36 members, is accountable for the strategic government of Florence. The title is the equivalent of Lord Mayor in the meaning of an actual executive leader.

The office of Gonfaloniere was created in 1781 by Leopold II, Grand Duke of Tuscany. It was replaced by the office of Mayor in 1865, during the early Kingdom of Italy.

The current mayor of Florence is Dario Nardella, a left-wing musician member of the Democratic Party.

Overview

According to the Italian Constitution, the Mayor of Florence is member of the Florence's City Council. Although the title Mayor is not held by the heads of the five boroughs of Florence, because they do not actually preside over self-governmental municipalities.

The Mayor is elected by the population of Florence. Citizens elect also the members of the City Council, which also controls Mayor's policy guidelines and is able to enforce his resignation by a motion of no confidence. The Mayor is entitled to appoint and release the members of his government.

Since 1995 the Mayor is elected directly by Florence's electorate: in all mayoral elections in Italy in cities with a population higher than 15,000 the voters express a direct choice for the mayor or an indirect choice voting for the party of the candidate's coalition. If no candidate receives at least 50% of votes, the top two candidates go to a second round after two weeks. The election of the City Council is based on a direct choice for the candidate with a preference vote: the candidate with the majority of the preferences is elected. The number of the seats for each party is determined proportionally.

The seat of the City Council is the city hall Palazzo Vecchio in Piazza della Signoria.

List of Mayor of Florence (1781–present)

Grand Duchy of Tuscany (1781–1859)
In 1781 was created the office of Annual Gonfaloniere of Florence who was appointed by the Grand Duke of Tuscany every year.

1781–1783 – Giuseppe Maria Panzanini
1783–1784 – Francesco Catellini da Castiglione
1784–1785 – Giovan Giorgio Ugolini
1785–1786 – Maldonato Amadio d'Alma
1786–1787 – Alberto Rimbotti
1787–1788 – Giuseppe Baldovinetti di Poggio 
1788–1789 – Giuseppe Arnaldi
1789–1790 – Alberto Rimbotti
1790–1791 – Miniato Miniati
1791–1792 – Pietro Baldigiani
1792–1793 – Ferdinando de' Bardi
1793–1794 – Pietro Soderini
1794–1795 – Antonio da Castiglione
1795–1796 – Francesco Passerini
1796–1797 – Vieri De' Cerchi
1797–1798 – Ottavio Pitti
1798–1799 – Leonardo Buonarroti
1799–1800 – Orazio Smeraldo Morelli
1800–1801 – Francesco Catellini da Castiglione
1801–1802 – Niccolò Arrighi
1802–1803 – Michele Roti
1803–1804 – Pietro Mancini
1804–1805 – Giovanni Carlo Mori Ubaldini
1805–1806 – Giulio Orlandini
1806–1807 – Vespasiano Marzichi
1807–1808 – Tommaso Guadagni
1808–1809 – Filippo Guadagni

In 1809, during the period of the newborn Kingdom of Etruria, it was temporarily created the office of Maire of Florence.

1809–1813 – Emilio Pucci
1813–1815 – Girolamo Bartolommei

In 1815 the office of Gonfaloniere of Florence was restored.

1815–1816 – Giovanni Battista Gondi
1816–1817 – Giovanni Rosselli de Turco
1817–1821 – Tommaso Corsi
1821–1825 – Jacopo Guidi
1826–1828 – Giovanni Battista Covoni
1829–1831 – Giovanni Battista Andrea Boubon del Monte
1832–1834 – Cosimo Antinori
1835–1840 – Gaetano de' Pazzi
1841–1842 – Luigi de Cambray Digny
1843–1846 – Pier Francesco Rinuccini
1847 – Vincenzo Peruzzi
1847–1848 — Bettino Ricasoli
1848–1850 — Ubaldino Peruzzi
1850 – Carlo Torrigiani
1850–1853 – Vincenzo Capponi
1854–1859 – Eduardo Dufour Berté

Kingdom of Italy (1861–1946)
In 1865, the Kingdom of Italy created the office of the Mayor of Florence (Sindaco di Firenze), chosen by the City council.
In 1926, the Fascist dictatorship abolished mayors and City councils, replacing them with an authoritarian Podestà chosen by the National Fascist Party.

Timeline

Republic of Italy (1946–present)

City Council election (1946–1995)
From 1946 to 1995, the Mayor of Florence was chosen by the City Council.

Notes

Direct election (since 1995)
Since 1995, enacting a new law on local administrations (1993), the Mayor of Florence is chosen by direct election, originally every four, and since 1999 every five years.

Notes

Timeline

By time in office

Elections

City Council elections, 1946–1990

Number of votes for each party:

Notes

Number of seats in the City Council for each party:

Mayoral and City Council election, 1995
The election took place on 23 April 1995.

|- 
| colspan="7"| 
|-
|- style="background-color:#E9E9E9;text-align:center;"
! colspan="4" rowspan="1" style="text-align:left;" | Parties and coalitions
! colspan="1" | Votes
! colspan="1" | %
! colspan="1" | Seats
|-
| style="background-color:pink" rowspan="7" |
| style="background-color:" |
| style="text-align:left;" | Democratic Party of the Left (Partito Democratico della Sinistra)
| PDS
| 88,105 || 36.05% || 19
|-
| style="background-color:" |
| style="text-align:left;" | Communist Refoundation Party (Rifondazione Comunista)
| PRC
| 25,347 || 10.37% || 5
|-
| style="background-color:orange" |
| style="text-align:left;" | Democratic Pact (Patto Democratico)
| PD
| 9,090 || 3.72% || 2
|-
| style="background-color:" |
| style="text-align:left;" | Federation of the Greens (Federazione dei Verdi)
| FdV
| 7,168 || 2.93% || 1
|-
| style="background-color:" |
| style="text-align:left;" | Labour Federation (Federazione Laburista)
| FL
| 5,117 || 2.09% || 1
|-
| style="background-color:" |
| style="text-align:left;" | Italian Republican Party (Partito Repubblicano Italiano)
| PRI
| 2,115 || 0.87% || 0
|-
| style="background-color:" |
| style="text-align:left;" | Others 
| 
| 8,786 || 3.60% || 1
|- style="background-color:pink"
| style="text-align:left;" colspan="4" | Primicerio coalition (Centre-left)
| 145,728 || 59.63% || 29
|-
| style="background-color:lightblue" rowspan="3" |
| style="background-color:" |
| style="text-align:left;" | Forza Italia-Christian Democratic Centre 
| FI-CCD
| 41,173 || 16.85% || 8
|-
| style="background-color:" |
| style="text-align:left;" | Italian People's Party (Partito Popolare Italiano)
| PPI
| 10,389 || 4.25% || 2
|-
| style="background-color:gold" |
| style="text-align:left;" | Pannella List (Lista Pannela)
| LP
| 2,914 || 1.19% || 0
|- style="background-color:lightblue"
| colspan="4" style="text-align:left;" | Morales coalition (Centre-right)
| 54,476 || 22.29% || 10
|-
| style="background-color:" |
| style="text-align:left;" colspan="2" | National Alliance (Alleanza Nazionale)
| AN
| 39,298 || 16.08% || 7
|-
| style="background-color:" |
| style="text-align:left;" colspan="2" | Others 
| 
| 4,875 || 2.00% || 0
|-
| colspan="7" style="background-color:#E9E9E9" | 
|- style="font-weight:bold;"
| style="text-align:left;" colspan="4" | Total
| 244,377 || 100% || 46
|-
| colspan="7" style="background-color:#E9E9E9" | 
|-
| style="text-align:left;" colspan="4" | Votes cast / turnout 
| 277,612 || 82.57% || style="background-color:#E9E9E9;" |
|-
| style="text-align:left;" colspan="4" | Registered voters
| 336,230 ||  || style="background-color:#E9E9E9;" |
|-
| colspan="7" style="background-color:#E9E9E9" | 
|-
| style="text-align:left;" colspan="7" | Source: Ministry of the Interior
|}

Mayoral and City Council election, 1999
The election took place on 13 June 1999.

|- 
| colspan="7"| 
|-
|- style="background-color:#E9E9E9;text-align:center;"
! colspan="4" rowspan="1" style="text-align:left;" | Parties and coalitions
! colspan="1" | Votes
! colspan="1" | %
! colspan="1" | Seats
|-
| style="background-color:pink" rowspan="7" |
| style="background-color:" |
| style="text-align:left;" | Democrats of the Left (Democratici di Sinistra)
| DS
| 61,274 || 31.48% || 18
|-
| style="background-color:" |
| style="text-align:left;" | Party of Italian Communists (Comunisti Italiani)
| PdCI
| 11,166 || 5.74% || 3
|-
| style="background-color:orange" |
| style="text-align:left;" | The Democrats (I Democratici)
| Dem
| 8,819 || 4.53% || 2
|-
| style="background-color:pink" |
| style="text-align:left;" | Italian People's Party (Partito Popolare Italiano)
| PPI
| 7,133 || 3.66% || 2
|-
| style="background-color:purple" |
| style="text-align:left;" | Italian Democratic Socialists (Socialisti Democratici Italiani)
| SDI
| 4,743 || 2.44% || 1
|-
| style="background-color:" |
| style="text-align:left;" | Federation of the Greens (Federazione dei Verdi)
| FdV
| 4,364 || 2.24% || 1
|-
| style="background-color:" |
| style="text-align:left;" | Others 
| 
| 3,386 || 1.74% || 1
|- style="background-color:pink"
| style="text-align:left;" colspan="4" | Domenici coalition (Centre-left)
| 100,885 || 51.83% || 28
|-
| style="background-color:lightblue" rowspan="6" |
| style="background-color:" |
| style="text-align:left;" | Forza Italia 
| FI
| 29,954 || 15.39% || 8
|-
| style="background-color:" |
| style="text-align:left;" | National Alliance (Alleanza Nazionale)
| AN
| 25,320 || 13.01% || 6
|-
| style="background-color:" |
| style="text-align:left;" | Christian Democratic Centre (Centro Cristiano Democratico)
| CCD
| 5,323 || 2.73% || 1
|-
| style="background-color:#3B3B6D" |
| style="text-align:left;" | Sgarbi List (Lista Sgarbi)
| LS
| 2,438 || 1.25% || 0
|-
| style="background-color:blue" |
| style="text-align:left;" | Pensioners' Party (Partito Pensionati)
| PP
| 995 || 0.51% || 0
|-
| style="background-color:" |
| style="text-align:left;" | Others 
| 
| 4,276 || 2.20% || 1
|- style="background-color:lightblue"
| colspan="4" style="text-align:left;" | Scaramuzzi coalition (Centre-right)
| 68,306 || 35.10% || 16
|-
| style="background-color:" |
| style="text-align:left;" colspan="2" | Communist Refoundation Party (Rifondazione Comunista)
| PRC
| 10,945 || 5.62% || 2
|-
| style="background-color:" |
| style="text-align:left;" colspan="2" | Others 
| 
| 14,492 || 7.47% || 0
|-
| colspan="7" style="background-color:#E9E9E9" | 
|- style="font-weight:bold;"
| style="text-align:left;" colspan="4" | Total
| 194,628 || 100% || 46
|-
| colspan="7" style="background-color:#E9E9E9" | 
|-
| style="text-align:left;" colspan="4" | Votes cast / turnout 
| 223,494 || 69.04% || style="background-color:#E9E9E9;" |
|-
| style="text-align:left;" colspan="4" | Registered voters
| 323,704 ||  || style="background-color:#E9E9E9;" |
|-
| colspan="7" style="background-color:#E9E9E9" | 
|-
| style="text-align:left;" colspan="7" | Source: Ministry of the Interior
|}

Mayoral and City Council election, 2004
The election took place in two rounds: the first on 12–13 June and the second on 26–27 June 2004.

|- 
| colspan="7"| 
|-
|- style="background-color:#E9E9E9;text-align:center;"
! colspan="4" rowspan="1" style="text-align:left;" | Parties and coalitions
! colspan="1" | Votes
! colspan="1" | %
! colspan="1" | Seats
|-
| style="background-color:pink" rowspan="6" |
| style="background-color:" |
| style="text-align:left;" | Democrats of the Left (Democratici di Sinistra)
| DS
| 62,572 || 30.55% || 18
|-
| style="background-color:pink" |
| style="text-align:left;" | The Daisy (La Margherita)
| DL
| 16,756 || 8.18% || 5
|-
| style="background-color:" |
| style="text-align:left;" | Party of Italian Communists (Comunisti Italiani)
| PdCI
| 11,065 || 5.40% || 3
|-
| style="background-color:" |
| style="text-align:left;" | Federation of the Greens (Federazione dei Verdi)
| FdV
| 5,024 || 2.45% || 1
|-
| style="background-color:purple" |
| style="text-align:left;" | Italian Democratic Socialists (Socialisti Democratici Italiani)
| SDI
| 4,786 || 2.34% || 1
|-
| style="background-color:" |
| style="text-align:left;" | Others 
| 
| 5,614 || 2.73% || 0
|- style="background-color:pink"
| style="text-align:left;" colspan="4" | Domenici coalition (Centre-left)
| 105,817 || 51.67% || 28
|-
| style="background-color:lightblue" rowspan="4" |
| style="background-color:" |
| style="text-align:left;" | Forza Italia 
| FI
| 33,349 || 16.28% || 8
|-
| style="background-color:" |
| style="text-align:left;" | National Alliance (Alleanza Nazionale)
| AN
| 21,256 || 10.38% || 5
|-
| style="background-color:" |
| style="text-align:left;" | Union of the Centre (Unione di Centro)
| UDC
| 7,913 || 3.86% || 1
|-
| style="background-color:" |
| style="text-align:left;" | Lega Nord  
| LN
| 888 || 0.43% || 0
|- style="background-color:lightblue"
| colspan="4" style="text-align:left;" | Valentino coalition (Centre-right)
| 63,406 || 30.96% || 14
|-
| style="background-color:" |
| style="text-align:left;" colspan="2" | Communist Refoundation Party (Rifondazione Comunista)
| PRC
| 21,409 || 10.45% || 4
|-
| style="background-color:" |
| style="text-align:left;" colspan="2" | Others 
| 
| 14,165 || 6.91% || 0
|-
| colspan="7" style="background-color:#E9E9E9" | 
|- style="font-weight:bold;"
| style="text-align:left;" colspan="4" | Total
| 204,797 || 100% || 46
|-
| colspan="7" style="background-color:#E9E9E9" | 
|-
| style="text-align:left;" colspan="4" | Votes cast / turnout 
| 233,200 || 75.95% || style="background-color:#E9E9E9;" |
|-
| style="text-align:left;" colspan="4" | Registered voters
| 307,035 ||  || style="background-color:#E9E9E9;" |
|-
| colspan="7" style="background-color:#E9E9E9" | 
|-
| style="text-align:left;" colspan="7" | Source: Ministry of the Interior
|}

Mayoral and City Council election, 2009
The election took place in two rounds: the first on 6–7 June and the second on 21–22 June 2009.

|- 
| colspan="7"| 
|-
|- style="background-color:#E9E9E9;text-align:center;"
! colspan="4" rowspan="1" style="text-align:left;" | Parties and coalitions
! colspan="1" | Votes
! colspan="1" | %
! colspan="1" | Seats
|-
| style="background-color:pink" rowspan="5" |
| style="background-color:" |
| style="text-align:left;" | Democratic Party (Partito Democratico)
| PD
| 68,245 || 35.29% || 22
|-
| style="background-color:#7C0A02" |
| style="text-align:left;" | Renzi List (Lista Renzi)
| LR
| 10,526 || 5.44% || 3
|-
| style="background-color:orange" |
| style="text-align:left;" | Italy of Values (Italia dei Valori)
| IdV
| 5,540 || 2.86% || 1
|-
| style="background-color:" |
| style="text-align:left;" | Left Ecology Freedom (Sinistra Ecologia Libertà)
| SEL
| 4,478 || 2.32% || 1
|-
| style="background-color:" |
| style="text-align:left;" | Others 
| 
| 5,732 || 2.96% || 1
|- style="background-color:pink"
| style="text-align:left;" colspan="4" | Renzi coalition (Centre-left)
| 94,521 || 48.88% || 28
|-
| style="background-color:lightblue" rowspan="4" |
| style="background-color:" |
| style="text-align:left;" | The People of Freedom (Il Popolo della Libertà)
| PdL
| 39,361 || 20.36% || 10
|-
| style="background-color:purple" |
| style="text-align:left;" | Galli List (Lista Galli)
| LG
| 17,563 || 9.08% || 4
|-
| style="background-color:" |
| style="text-align:left;" | Lega Nord  
| LN
| 2,660 || 1.38% || 0
|-
| style="background-color:" |
| style="text-align:left;" | Others 
| 
| 2,022 || 1.04% || 0
|- style="background-color:lightblue"
| colspan="4" style="text-align:left;" | Galli coalition (Centre-right)
| 61,606 || 31.86% || 14
|-
| style="background-color:#FA6E79" rowspan="3" |
| style="background-color:" |
| style="text-align:left;" | Greens-European Republicans Movement (Verdi-Repubblicani Europei)
| FdV-MRE
| 7,692 || 3.98% || 2
|-
| style="background-color:" |
| style="text-align:left;" | Federation of the Left (Federazione della Sinistra)
| FdS
| 4,954 || 2.56% || 0
|-
| style="background-color:" |
| style="text-align:left;" | Others 
| 
| 833 || 0.43% || 0
|- style="background-color:#FA6E79"
| colspan="4" style="text-align:left;" | Spini coalition (Left-wing)
| 13,479 || 6.97% || 2
|-
| style="background-color:orange" |
| style="text-align:left;" colspan="2"| De Zordo List (Lista De Zordo) 
| LDZ
| 7,336 || 3.79% || 1
|-
| style="background-color:blue" |
| style="text-align:left;" colspan="2"| Citizens' Committees (Comitati Cittadini) 
| CC
| 6,325 || 3.27% || 1
|-
| style="background-color:" |
| style="text-align:left;"  colspan="2" | Others 
| 
| 10,104 || 5.23% || 0
|-
| colspan="7" style="background-color:#E9E9E9" | 
|- style="font-weight:bold;"
| style="text-align:left;" colspan="4" | Total
| 193,371 || 100% || 46
|-
| colspan="7" style="background-color:#E9E9E9" | 
|-
| style="text-align:left;" colspan="4" | Votes cast / turnout 
| 216,541 || 73.86% || style="background-color:#E9E9E9;" |
|-
| style="text-align:left;" colspan="4" | Registered voters
| 293,173 ||  || style="background-color:#E9E9E9;" |
|-
| colspan="7" style="background-color:#E9E9E9" | 
|-
| style="text-align:left;" colspan="7" | Source: Ministry of the Interior
|}

Mayoral and City Council election, 2014
The election took place on 25 May 2014.

|- 
| colspan="7"| 
|-
|- style="background-color:#E9E9E9;text-align:center;"
! colspan="4" rowspan="1" style="text-align:left;" | Parties and coalitions
! colspan="1" | Votes
! colspan="1" | %
! colspan="1" | Seats
|-
| style="background-color:pink" rowspan="3" |
| style="background-color:" |
| style="text-align:left;" | Democratic Party (Partito Democratico)
| PD
| 86,906 || 47.23% || 21
|-
| style="background-color:#FF3988" |
| style="text-align:left;" | Nardella List (Lista Nardella)
| LN
| 16,114 || 8.76% || 3
|-
| style="background-color:" |
| style="text-align:left;" | Others 
| 
| 6,898 || 3.75% || 0
|- style="background-color:pink"
| style="text-align:left;" colspan="4" | Nardella coalition (Centre-left)
| 109,918 || 59.74% || 24
|-
| style="background-color:lightblue" rowspan="3" |
| style="background-color:" |
| style="text-align:left;" | Forza Italia 
| FI
| 17,988 || 9.78% || 4
|-
| style="background-color:" |
| style="text-align:left;" | Lega Nord 
| LN
| 1,598 || 0.87% || 0
|-
| style="background-color:" |
| style="text-align:left;" | Others 
| 
| 2,654 || 1.44% || 0
|- style="background-color:lightblue"
| colspan="4" style="text-align:left;" | Stella coalition (Centre-right)
| 22,240 || 12.09% || 4
|-
| style="background-color:" |
| style="text-align:left;" colspan="2" | Five Star Movement (Movimento Cinque Stelle)
| M5S
| 17,486 || 9.50% || 3
|-
| style="background-color:#FA6E79" rowspan="3" |
| style="background-color:" |
| style="text-align:left;" | Left Ecology Freedom (Sinistra Ecologia Libertà)
| SEL
| 7,677 || 4.17% || 2
|-
| style="background-color:#EB4C42" |
| style="text-align:left;" | Florence to Left (Firenze a Sinistra)
| FaS
| 4,376 || 2.38% || 1
|-
| style="background-color:" |
| style="text-align:left;" | Communist Refoundation Party (Rifondazione Comunista)
| PRC
| 2,554 || 1.39% || 0
|- style="background-color:#FA6E79"
| colspan="4" style="text-align:left;" | Grassi coalition (Left-wing)
| 14,607 || 7.94% || 3
|-
| style="background-color:#D3419D" |
| style="text-align:left;" colspan="2" | Scaletti List (Lista Scaletti)
| LS
| 7,507 || 4.08% || 1
|-
| style="background-color:" |
| style="text-align:left;" colspan="2" | Brothers of Italy (Fratelli d'Italia) 
| FdI
| 6,176 || 3.36% || 1
|-
| style="background-color:" |
| style="text-align:left;" colspan="2" | Others 
| 
| 6,075 || 3.30% || 0
|-
| colspan="7" style="background-color:#E9E9E9" | 
|- style="font-weight:bold;"
| style="text-align:left;" colspan="4" | Total
| 184,009 || 100% || 36
|-
| colspan="7" style="background-color:#E9E9E9" | 
|-
| style="text-align:left;" colspan="4" | Votes cast / turnout 
| 194,245 || 67.22% || style="background-color:#E9E9E9;" |
|-
| style="text-align:left;" colspan="4" | Registered voters
| 288,971 ||  || style="background-color:#E9E9E9;" |
|-
| colspan="7" style="background-color:#E9E9E9" | 
|-
| style="text-align:left;" colspan="7" | Source: Ministry of the Interior
|}

Mayoral and City Council election, 2019
The election took place on 26 May 2019.

|- 
| colspan="7"| 
|-
|- style="background-color:#E9E9E9;text-align:center;"
! colspan="4" rowspan="1" style="text-align:left;" | Parties and coalitions
! colspan="1" | Votes
! colspan="1" | %
! colspan="1" | Seats
|-
| style="background-color:pink" rowspan="4" |
| style="background-color:" |
| style="text-align:left;" | Democratic Party (Partito Democratico)
| PD
| 74,020 || 41.23% || 19
|-
| style="background-color:#FF3988" |
| style="text-align:left;" | Nardella List (Lista Nardella)
| LN
| 14,914 || 8.31% || 3
|-
| style="background-color:gold" |
| style="text-align:left;" | More Europe (Più Europa)
| +Eu
| 3,257 || 1.81% || 0
|-
| style="background-color:" |
| style="text-align:left;" | Others 
| 
| 8,154|| 4.54% || 0
|- style="background-color:pink"
| style="text-align:left;" colspan="4" | Nardella coalition (Centre-left)
| 100,345 || 55.90% || 22
|-
| style="background-color:lightblue" rowspan="4" |
| style="background-color:" |
| style="text-align:left;" | Lega Nord 
| LN
| 25,922 || 14.44% || 6
|-
| style="background-color:" |
| style="text-align:left;" | Forza Italia 
| FI
| 7,629 || 4.25% || 3
|-
| style="background-color:" |
| style="text-align:left;" | Brothers of Italy (Fratelli d'Italia)
| FdI
| 7,617 || 4.24% || 1
|-
| style="background-color:" |
| style="text-align:left;" | Others 
| 
| 4,448 || 2.48% || 0
|- style="background-color:lightblue"
| colspan="4" style="text-align:left;" | Bocci coalition (Centre-right)
| 45,616 || 25.45% || 10
|-
| style="background-color:#FA6E79" rowspan="3" |
| style="background-color:#EB4C42" |
| style="text-align:left;" | Florence Open City (Firenze Città Aperta)
| 
| 5,596 || 3.12% || 2
|-
| style="background-color:" |
| style="text-align:left;" | Italian Left (Sinistra Italiana)
| SI
| 4,056 || 2.26% || 0
|-
| style="background-color:" |
| style="text-align:left;" | Power to the People! (Potere al Popolo!)
| PaP
| 3,384 || 1.88% || 0
|- style="background-color:#FA6E79"
| colspan="4" style="text-align:left;" | Moro Bundu coalition (Left-wing)
| 13,036 || 7.26% || 2
|-
| style="background-color:" |
| style="text-align:left;" colspan="2" | Five Star Movement (Movimento Cinque Stelle)
| M5S
| 12,574 || 7.00% || 2
|-
| style="background-color:" |
| style="text-align:left;" colspan="2" | Others 
| 
| 7,952 || 4.43% || 0
|-
| colspan="7" style="background-color:#E9E9E9" | 
|- style="font-weight:bold;"
| style="text-align:left;" colspan="4" | Total
| 179,523 || 100% || 36
|-
| colspan="7" style="background-color:#E9E9E9" | 
|-
| style="text-align:left;" colspan="4" | Votes cast / turnout 
| 196,601 || 68.06% || style="background-color:#E9E9E9;" |
|-
| style="text-align:left;" colspan="4" | Registered voters
| 288,866 ||  || style="background-color:#E9E9E9;" |
|-
| colspan="7" style="background-color:#E9E9E9" | 
|-
| style="text-align:left;" colspan="7" | Source: Ministry of the Interior
|}

Deputy Mayor
The office of the Deputy Mayor of Brescia was officially created in 1995 with the adoption of the new local administration law. The Deputy Mayor is nominated and eventually dismissed by the Mayor. 

Notes

See also
 Timeline of Florence

References

Florence
Mayors